Oregocerata caucana is a species of moth of the family Tortricidae. It is found in Colombia.

The length of the forewings is about 8.7 mm. The ground colour of the forewings is whitish, strigulated (finely streaked) and suffused with pale orange with inconspicuous dark specks. The hindwings are whitish, tinged with cream in the apical third.

Etymology
The species name refers to the Cauca Department in Colombia.

References

Moths described in 2005
Euliini